"After the War Is Over Will There Be Any 'Home Sweet Home'?" is a World War I–era song released in 1917. Elmer J. Pourmon and Joseph Woodruff wrote the lyrics. Harry Andrieu composed the music. The cover lists Woodruff as composer and Pourmon as lyricist. Contradictory information inside the sheet music lists Harry Andrieu as composer, and Woodruff and Pourmon as lyricists.

The song was published by Joe Morris Music Co. of New York City. Pfeiffer Illustrating Co. designed the sheet music cover. It features a mother comforting her children. Below her are battle ruins with the body of a dead soldier in the center. To the right, is an inset photo of J. Woodruff. It was written for both voice and piano.

Lyricist Joseph Woodruff performed the song.
 
The sheet music can be found at the Pritzker Military Museum & Library.
 
The song is considered one of the bleaker assessments of life in postwar Europe. The lyrics emphasize the inevitable feeling of loss and change. The chorus is as follows:

References

Bibliography

External links 
 "After the War Is Over Will There Be Any 'Home Sweet Home'?" at the Illinois Digital Archives

1917 songs
Songs of World War I